Toledo Sports Arena was a 5,230-seat multi-purpose arena at 1 Main Street, Toledo, Ohio. It was built in 1947 and demolished in 2007.

As a concert venue, it seated 6,500, for theater concerts and stage shows, 4,400 and for boxing and wrestling, 8,250; also, the arena was 33⅔ feet tall. The exhibit hall accommodated up to 2,500, for concerts and meetings and 1,800, for banquets. In addition, there were three meeting rooms, totaling  of space.

The Sports Arena was home to the following ice hockey teams:
Toledo Mercurys (IHL) (1947–1962)
Toledo Blades/Hornets (IHL) (1963–1974)
Toledo Goaldiggers (IHL) (1974–1986)
Toledo Storm (ECHL) (1991–2007)

The Sports Arena was the inspiration for the Yes song, "Our Song," which was written after their July 30, 1977 performance in which the arena's interior temperature reached .

The arena played host to the politically motivated Vote for Change Tour on October 2, 2004, featuring performances by Gob Roberts, Death Cab for Cutie and Pearl Jam, with special guests Peter Frampton, Pegi Young and Neil Young.

Local Promoter Brad McDonald held the Arena's final event on April 28, 2007, an "Extreme Toughman" event, a mixed martial art competition much like the UFC. Demolition of the Sports Arena took place in August of that year. The new arena, Huntington Center, was completed in October 2009, on the opposite side of the Maumee River, placing it in the center of downtown Toledo.

References

Defunct indoor arenas in Ohio
Indoor ice hockey venues in the United States
Sports venues in Toledo, Ohio
Convention centers in Ohio
Music venues in Ohio
Demolished sports venues in Ohio
Demolished music venues in the United States
Sports venues completed in 1947
1947 establishments in Ohio
Sports venues demolished in 2007
2007 disestablishments in Ohio